Junior Miss is a collection of semi-autobiographical stories by Sally Benson.

Junior Miss may also refer to:

Junior Miss (film), a 1945 film adaptation of the stories
one of the clothing sizes for young women
Distinguished Young Women, a program for high school students formerly known as America's Junior Miss
Junior Miss Stakes, a former graded stakes race for two-year-old fillies, not run since 1992